The Genesis Foundation, a UK-registered charity, was established by John Studzinski in 2001. Over the past 21 years, the Foundation has donated more than £20 million to the arts. Through its funding and partnership model, it has enabled opportunities for thousands of young artists, primarily in theatre and music, building both their experience and their resilience. Cross-disciplinary networking and mentoring are inherent to the Genesis Foundation and crucial to its work.  

The Foundation's main focus is on partnerships with leading arts organisations such as the Almeida Theatre, National Theatre, Young Vic Theatre, The Sixteen, and Jewish Book Week.  

While largely devoting its regular funding to training programmes that equip emerging artists for life as a creative professional, the Genesis Foundation has also become the UK's largest commissioner of sacred music, having commissioned 30 new choral works to date. In 2020, the Genesis Foundation launched the COVID-19 Artists Fund, an emergency response to help freelancers facing hardship, and the £1 million Genesis Kickstart Fund to provide grants for future-facing arts projects across the UK, all employing outstanding freelance creative talent.

History 

The Genesis Foundation was founded in January 2001 by investment banker and arts patron John Studzinski, CBE.

Since 2001, the Genesis Foundation has donated more than £20 million to the arts in the UK. Through its funding and partnership model, it has provided opportunities for thousands of young artists, primarily in theatre and music, building both their experience and their resilience.

In 2020, the foundation launched its £1m Genesis Kickstart Fund, designed to enable outstanding freelance artists to stay on their career paths and explore new possibilities in a world radically altered by COVID-19.

Partner organisations

National Theatre 
In 2017 the Genesis Foundation launched a partnership with the National Theatre, collaborating with its artistic director Rufus Norris on the development of new forms of music theatre in the UK. The Genesis Music Theatre Programme is part of the National Theatre's New Work Department and is overseen by Marc Tritschler, who was appointed Creative Director of Music at the NT in 2020.  

The first musical from the programme to reach the stage (in November 2021) was Hex, based on Sleeping Beauty. Hex returns to the stage of the National Theatre in late 2022.

The Foundation's relationship with Rufus Norris dates back to 2003, when he became the first Genesis Director at the Young Vic.

The Sixteen
Since 2010, the mainstay of the Genesis Foundation's partnership with leading British choral ensemble The Sixteen has been the Genesis Sixteen programme. Delivered at no charge to participants, it aims to nurture the next generation of talented choral singers and create a bridge between student and professional singing. It provides group tuition, individual mentoring and masterclasses run by vocal experts and is the only scheme of its kind. To date, more than 250 exceptional young singers have taken part of the programme.

The Genesis Foundation commissions new choral pieces from leading and emerging composers, which are premiered by Harry Christophers and The Sixteen and recorded for their record label CORO. James MacMillan’s Stabat mater, a 60-minute work for choir and string orchestra commissioned by the Genesis Foundation, was given its UK premiere by Harry Christophers, The Sixteen and Britten Sinfonia at the Barbican Centre, London in October 2016. The recording of the work was favourably reviewed and won numerous awards. In April 2018 a performance of the Stabat mater, presented by the Genesis Foundation, became the first concert to be live-streamed from the Sistine Chapel in the Vatican. It subsequently received its US premiere in November 2019 at Lincoln Center's Alice Tully Hall with Harry Christophers and The Sixteen.

In May 2018, four new choral works commissioned by the Genesis Foundation were premiered at a live-streamed concert at Eton College Chapel. The four young composers were mentored by James Macmillan and Harry Christophers and drew on texts from the Eton Choirbook.  

Past Genesis commissions include ‘Spirit, Strength & Sorrow’, three new Stabat Mater pieces by composers Alissa Firsova, Tõnu Kõrvits and Matthew Martin; ‘O Guiding Night’, music to poetry of the Spanish Mystics St. Teresa of Ávila and St. John of the Cross by Ruth Byrchmore, Tarik O'Regan and Roderick Williams; settings of Padre Pio’s Prayer by James MacMillan, Roxanna Panufnik and Will Todd, and Will Todd’s Among Angels, commissioned in honour of John Studzinski’s 50th birthday.

On 9 February 2016 the Genesis Foundation, in collaboration with the Choral Foundation, hosted a celebration of Vespers at the Chapel Royal, Hampton Court Palace. Cardinal Vincent Nichols and the Dean of the Chapels Royal, Richard Chartres KCVO, officiated at the service and the music was performed by Harry Christophers and The Sixteen. This was the first time since the 1550s that a Vespers service had been celebrated at the chapel according to the Latin Rite of the Catholic Church.

In June 2021, a concert presented by the Genesis Foundation at Farm Street Church in London took its inspiration from the life and writings of Cardinal Newman, who was canonised as Saint John Henry Newman in 2019. Newman: Meditation & Prayer included the world premieres of two new Genesis Foundation commissions, composed by Sir James MacMillan (Nothing in Vain) and Will Todd (I Shall be an Angel of Peace) for Harry Christophers and The Sixteen. Joining the musicians was Classic FM’s flagship morning show presenter Alexander Armstrong, reading the words of Cardinal Newman and of the poet and churchman John Donne.

In October 2022, the Genesis Foundation presented ‘A Tribute to the Life and Reign of Elizabeth II: A Garland for the Queen’, again performed by Harry Christophers and The Sixteen. The concert took place before an invited audience in the Chapel Royal of St Peter ad Vincula at the Tower of London  and was streamed online.

Most of the Genesis Foundation's concerts in recent years have reached a wide global audience via live-streams hosted by Classic FM.

Almeida Theatre 
The Genesis Foundation's partnership with the Almeida Theatre was inaugurated in 2019 with the Genesis Almeida New Writers’ Programme. This two-year programme, overseen by the theatre's Artistic Director Rupert Goold, supports emerging and mid-career writers in developing new plays for larger stages, providing them with a springboard to expand the scale, scope and ambition of their work and to create plays of wide cultural resonance.

Young Vic
From 2003 to 2009, the Genesis Foundation funded the Directors Program at the Young Vic, created by the Young Vic's former artistic director David Lan. This programme provided support for professional directors in the early stages of their career. Rufus Norris, now artistic director of the National Theatre, was the first Genesis Director.

As of 2018 the Genesis Foundation has funded the two-year Genesis Fellowship and the annual Genesis Future Directors award.

Since 2010, six Genesis Fellows have been selected to work closely with the Young Vic's Artistic Director, developing their skills as directors while participating in the theatre's programming and artistic planning. Each Genesis Fellow also contributes to the Young Vic's Creators Program and mentors recipients of the Genesis Future Directors Award.

The current Genesis Fellow is Jennifer Tang.

Former Genesis Fellows are: Nadia Latif (Fairview/My England, 2018), Gbolahan Obisesan (Cuttin’ It and Sus, 2016), Natalie Abrahami (Wings, Happy Days and Ah, Wilderness!, 2014), Carrie Cracknell (Macbeth co-directed with Lucy Guerin, 2012) and Joe Hill-Gibbins (A Midsummer Night’s Dream, Measure for Measure, 2010).

Past recipients of Genesis Future Directors Awards include Dadiow Lin (In a Word, 2019), Caitriona Shoobridge (Ivan and the Dogs, 2019), Lekan Lawal (Wild East, 2018),42 Debbie Hannan (Things of Dry Hours, 2018), John R. Wilkinson (Winter, 2017), Nancy Medina (Yellowman, 2017), Lucy J Skilbeck (The Bear and The Proposal, 2016), Bryony Shanahan (Trade, 2016), Ola Ince (Dutchman, 2015), Rikki Henry (Creditors, 2015), Tinuke Craig (Dirty Butterfly, 2014), Finn Beames (Man: Three plays by Tennessee Williams, 2014), Matthew Xia (Sizwe Banzi is Dead, 2013), and Ben Kidd (The Shawl, 2012).

Jewish Book Week 
In April 2021, the Genesis Foundation and Jewish Book Week (JBW) launched a new annual programme to champion emerging writers in the UK.

The Genesis Jewish Book Week Emerging Writers’ Programme offers bursaries and mentorship to 10 emerging writers over 18 years of age, of any background, writing fiction, non-fiction and poetry.

£1m Genesis Kickstart Fund 
The £1m Genesis Kickstart Fund was established in 2020 to enable talented freelance artists to stay on their career paths and explore new possibilities in a world radically altered by COVID-19. The fund, which ran for two years, supported 95 different projects around the UK, involving more than 1000 freelance creative professionals in paid work on projects spanning diverse artistic genres.

Recipients of grants from the Kickstart Fund will gain access to Genesis Connects, a network to enable artists and creative professionals to meet, foster new collaborations and benefit from mentoring opportunities. Genesis Connects will be launched in 2023.

Commissions

The Genesis Foundation is the leading commissioner of sacred music in the UK.

Sacred Music 
2022

Cecilia McDowall – O Lord, make thy servant, Elizabeth†

2021

Eoghan Desmond – Nothing in vain

Lisa Robertson – ...a link in a chain...

Anna Semple – A Meditation

Sir James MacMillan – Nothing in vain

Will Todd – I Shall Be An Angel of Peace  

2019

Bob Chilcott – O Lord, thou hast searched me, and known me

Sir James MacMillan – Le grand Inconnu

Angus McPhee – Panem Nostrum... Ave Maria

2018

Phillip Cooke – Ave Maria, Mater Dei  

Marco Galvani – Stella caeli  

Sir James MacMillan – O virgo prudentissima  

Joseph Phibbs – Nesciens Mater  

Stephen Hough – Hallowed

2016

Sir James MacMillan – Stabat mater

Will Todd – Whisper Him My Name

2014

Alissa Firsova – Stabat mater  

Tõnu Kõrvits – Stabat mater  

Matthew Martin – Stabat mater

2011

Ruth Byrchmore – The Dark Night  

Ruth Byrchmore – Prayer of St. Teresa of Ávila  

Tarik O’Regan – fleeting, God  

Tarik O’Regan – Beloved, all things ceased

Roderick Williams – O Guiding Night  

Roderick Williams – Let nothing trouble you  

2008

Sir James MacMillan – Padre Pio's Prayer  

Roxanna Panufnik – Stay with me

Will Todd – Stay with me, Lord  

2006

Will Todd – Among Angels  

1998

Roxanna Panufnik – Westminster Mass

Genesis Opera Project 
2008

Isidora Žebeljan – The Marathon Family

2006

David Bruce & Anna Reynolds – Push!

Emily Hall & Kit Peel – Sante

2003

Jurgen Simpson & Simon Doyle – Thwaite

Paul Frehner & Angela Murphy – Sirius on Earth

Jonathan Mills & Dorothy Porter – The Eternity Man

Isidora Žebeljan – Zora D

Other Commissions 
2019

Sir James MacMillan – Sing on, Sweet Thrush

2010

Chris Levine – LIGHT

2003

Isidora Žebeljan – Song of a Traveller in the Night, Minstrel's Dance

Genesis Foundation Prize
In 2012 the Genesis Foundation launched the Genesis Foundation Prize, a £25,000 prize awarded bi-annually to a mentor whose work has effected real change in the practice and careers of arts professionals or graduates. Past recipients include Hamish Dunbar, artistic director of Café Oto; Polly Staple, Director of London's Chisenhale Gallery; Hadrian Garrard, Director of Create London; Joe Robertson and Joe Murphy, artistic directors of Good Chance Theatre; and Rebecca Salter, President of the Royal Academy of Arts.

The 2022 winner is George Turvey, Co-founder and artistic director of Papatango Theatre Company.

Previous Partnerships and Projects

LAMDA  
The partnership between the Genesis Foundation and LAMDA ran for over 20 years.  

Dame Janet Suzman, vice-president of LAMDA and a close friend of John Studzinski, was keen to ensure that the arts weren't simply the privilege of the middle-classes and that training should be accessible to all. She encouraged John Studzinski to set up the Genesis LAMDA Scholarships, supporting the academic journey of exceptionally talented students by paying their entire tuition fees over the three-year BA (Hons) course in Professional Acting and also by contributing towards their living expenses.  

Over a period of 21 years the Genesis LAMDA scholarships enabled a total of 25 talented students to thrive as they developed the requisite skills and resilience for a substantial career. Among former Genesis LAMDA Scholars are Ben Aldridge, Samuel Barnett, Carys Bowkett, Tom Riley, Abubakar Salim, Amy Stacy and Stuart Thompson. View the full list here.

The Genesis LAMDA network (2017-2020) was conceived as a mentoring programme for actors, stage managers and technicians. Through the programme, final-year students were paired with experienced alumni so that they could acquire additional skills and knowledge to equip them for successful, sustainable careers. Many mentor-mentee relationships have developed into friendships beyond the official network.

Royal Court Theatre 
John Studzinski, and subsequently the Genesis Foundation, supported the Royal Court Theatre’s International Playwrights’ programme for over 20 years. This partnership enabled over 300 writers from more than 70 countries, working in over 40 languages, to have their work read, developed and directed by the Royal Court Theatre's International team, headed by the late Elyse Dodgson.

Older Projects 
In 2001, the Genesis Foundation was inaugurated with the Genesis Opera Project. A collaboration with Aldeburgh and the Almeida Theatre, the initiative championed the writing of new one-act operas. The Foundation subsequently supported OperaGenesis at the Royal Opera House and scholarships at Welsh National Opera, among many others.

Exhibitions

Bill Viola / Michelangelo: Life, Death, Rebirth at the Royal Academy of Arts 
The Genesis Foundation sponsored the Royal Academy of Arts’ major exhibition, Bill Viola / Michelangelo: Life, Death, Rebirth, which ran from 26 January to 31 March 2019. The exhibition paired installations by pioneering video artist Bill Viola with rarely seen drawings by Michelangelo, exploring how these artists shared a deep preoccupation with the nature of human experience and existence, despite working five centuries apart and in radically different media. This was the first time that these artists’ works had been seen together.

Living with gods: peoples, places and worlds beyond at the British Museum 
The Genesis Foundation was the sole sponsor of a major new exhibition Living with gods: peoples, places and worlds beyond at the British Museum, which ran from 2 November 2017 to 8 April 2018 and examined the practice and expression of religious beliefs in the lives of individuals and communities across the world.

References

External links 
 Genesis Foundation

Charities based in London
Organizations established in 2001
Arts organisations based in the United Kingdom
2001 establishments in England
Arts charities